In geometry, the augmented truncated tetrahedron is one of the Johnson solids. It is created by attaching a triangular cupola to one hexagonal face of a truncated tetrahedron.

External links
 

Johnson solids